Akhouri Sinha is a professor in the Department of Genetics, Cell Biology and Development at the University of Minnesota. The United States has named a mountain in Antarctica in honour of Sinha, Mt Sinha. Mr Sinha's native place is Churamanpur, a village in the state of Bihar in the eastern part of India.

References

Indian geneticists
Scientists from Bihar
University of Minnesota faculty
Living people
Year of birth missing (living people)
20th-century Indian biologists